The Red de Transporte de Pasajeros de la Ciudad de México (RTP; English: Mexico City Passenger Transportation Network) offers urban bus service in Mexico City. It is administered by the Government of Mexico City and carries approximately 400,000 passengers per day on more than 100 routes.

History
Public bus service in the Mexico City metropolitan area was provided by several private concessions starting from 1916, including the Lomas de Chapultepec Primera Clase, which was founded in 1942. That company faced bankruptcy in 1958 and was federalized when the Distrito Federal de México (DDF) took over operations, renaming the service to Lomas de Chapultepec–Reforma Ruta 100, which continued to compete with private companies until August 1981, when the DDF revoked private concessions and formed Autotransportes Urbanos de Pasajeros Ruta 100 (Route 100). Ruta 100 continued to operate until April 7, 1995, when that system went bankrupt.

In 1994, Ruta 100 operated approximately 2,900 buses on 210 routes over a   network, carrying 2.9 million passengers per day. With the demise of Ruta 100, part of the operator's fleet and employees were transferred to the Servicio de Transportes Eléctricos (STE) while the former network was operated by the Consejo de Incautación (Board of Seizure) under the Sistema Temporal de Transporte (STT; Temporary Transportation System), carrying 544 thousand daily passengers using 830 buses on 75 routes; the STT fleet was inherited by RTP when it was formed in January 2000.

A strike by Sindicato de Trabajadores de la Red de Transportes de Pasajeros (STRTP) was averted in 2014 when the Distrito Federal agreed to grant STRTP workers a 4% increase in wages and a reduction to 40 hours per week. The name of the system changed to Sistema de Movilidad 1 (M1, Mobility System 1) on June 15, 2016, but the name change was reverted to RTP in January 2019.

Services
RTP offers several service classes:
 Ordinario (Ordinary): 95 routes,  2 fare
 Expreso (Express): 25 routes,  4 fare
 Ecobús (Eco-friendly): CNG,  5 fare
 Atenea (Athena): women-only service,  2 fare
 Escolar (School):
 Nochebús (Night): 6 routes,  7 fare

Routes
Routes are divided into seven geographical areas (Módulo):
 Camino al Huizachito no. 25, col. La Navidad, alcaldía Cuajimalpa de Morelos
 Av. México No. 6114, col. Huichapan, alcaldía Xochimilco
 Aquiles Serdán no. 5865, col. Pueblo Tulyehualco, alcaldía Xochimilco
 Av. Telecomunicaciones s/no. Col. Ejército Constitucionalista, alcaldía Iztapalapa
 Calle 301 No. 1001, col. Nueva Atzacoalco, alcaldía Gustavo A. Madero
 Puerto Mazatlán no. 11, col. La Pastora, alcaldía Gustavo A. Madero
 Palestina no. 170, col. El Recreo, alcaldía Azcapotzalco

Vehicles
In 2020, RTP operated 1,279 buses, divided into the following services and types:
 72 Ecobús
 152 Atenea
 349 Expreso
 566 Ordinario
 105 Escolar
 22 articulated
 13 bi-articulated

References

External links

 Other Mexico City Buses
 RTP route network

2000 establishments in Mexico
Transportation in Mexico City